The West Coast Group Representation Constituency is a five-member Group Representation Constituency (GRC) located in the western area of Singapore. The five divisions consists: Ayer Rajah-Gek Poh, West Coast, Boon Lay, Nanyang and Telok Blangah. West Coast GRC covers the areas of Ayer Rajah, Dover, Pasir Panjang, the south-western area, West Coast, Jurong, Jurong Island, Sentosa, Telok Blangah, Tuas and much of Singapore's southern & western territorial waters and offshore islands in the area. The current Members of Parliament for the constituency are S Iswaran, Desmond Lee, Foo Mee Har, Rachel Ong and Ang Wei Neng from the People's Action Party (PAP).

Members of Parliament

Electoral results

Elections in 1990s

Elections in 2000s

Elections in 2010s

Elections in 2020s

References

2015 General Election's result
2011 General Election's result
2006 General Election's result
2001 General Election's result

Singaporean electoral divisions
Boon Lay
Bukit Merah
Clementi
Jurong East
Jurong West
Pioneer, Singapore
Queenstown, Singapore
Southern Islands
Tuas
Western Islands Planning Area